Nazneen is a 1951 Indian film directed by N. K. Ziree and starring Madhubala, Nasir Khan and Jayant. It was the debut film of Amjad Khan.

Plot 
It starts with a young Kundan, who was often absorbed in day dreaming. He would often be thinking and thinking or planning in his imagination of his sweet heart. Youth sees impossible things with a silver lining.
But his parents expected differently from him. So they decided to end all this nonsense and fixed up marriage with the girl to whom he was betrothed in the childhood.
In order to avoid his marriage Kundan comes over to Bombay with the help of his friend Ghunchoo. Kundan and Ghunchoo while in Bombay soon meet Professor Dho, who after putting them a number of interesting questions agrees to give them jobs. Professor Dho was a very famous sculptor, these days he was engaged in making a statue of a queen of beauty, in fact a model damsel, whom he would name Nazneen. Its exhibition was shortly to be inaugurated for prominent citizens and public. Kundan whowas entrusted with the job of looking after this statue found himself in a new world, as in the twinkling of an eye the statue changed into a queen of beauty, a lovely woman in real and blood. He was overjoyed, for he thought that his dreams had changed in reality. At the time of the exhibition Professor Dho and the public thought that they were befooled when they found the statue missing.
On enquiry from Kundan he related a story, which Professor Dho and Ghunchoo thought to be a riddle. Miss Chocolate tried to persuade him to flash out the truth. Nobody would believe him what he described about "Nazneen". He was considered to be a lunatic and forced to be admitted in the lunatic asylum.
His love for Nazneen did not end even in the asylum and soon he found himself in the court to say something of the charges levelled against him. He escaped the court room and came to the house to meet his Nazneen. To his utter disappointment he found the statue in its original place. There was no living beauty but a statue with tears in its eyes.
His heart was broken.

Cast 
The main cast of the film included:
Madhubala
Nasir Khan
Jayant
Agha
Chanchal
Om Prakash  as Professor Dho
Ram Avtar
Cuckoo
Pratima Devi
Imtiaz Khan
Amjad Khan

Soundtrack

Reception 
The film was a commercial hit, grossing 65 lakh against a budget of 15 lakh; thus becoming the twelfth highest earning film of 1951.

Nazneen was one of the most popular pictures Madhubala made in her early career. The film was much appreciated by her fans. One of them died in East Pakistan swooning, "Nazneen is with me."

References

External links 

1950s Hindi-language films
1951 films